François Martroye (1852, Brussels – 8 September 1933, Paris), was a 20th-century historian of ancient Rome. Martoye wrote widely on the history of the Lower Empire, especially that of North Africa, and the figures of Genseric and Saint Augustine. A vice-president of the Société des Antiquaires de France, he wrote numerous articles in the Memoirs of the society.

Works 
1904: L'Occident à l'époque byzantine : Goths et Vandales, 1904
1904: Une tentative de révolution sociale en Afrique : donatistes et circoncellions, 1904
1907: Genséric : La Conquête vandale en Afrique et la destruction de l'Empire d'Occident, 1907
1909: Saint Augustin et le droit d'héritage des églises et des monastères, étude sur les origines du droit des communautés religieuses à la succession des clercs et des moines, 1909
1910: De la Date d'une entrée solennelle de Justinien, 1910
1911: Saint Augustin et la compétence de la juridiction ecclésiastique au Ve, 1911
1914: La Répression du donatisme et la politique religieuse de Constantin et de ses successeurs en Afrique, 1914
1919: L'Asile et la législation impériale du IVe au VIe, 1919
1919: Procédure dans les actions en revendicaton d'objets volés à propos de l'épître 153 de saint Augustin, 1919
1924: Le Testament de saint Grégoire de Nazianze, 1924
1926: Notice sur la vie, la carrière et les œuvres du général de division Legrand-Girarde, 1926
1928: La Monnaie d'or et les payements dans les caisses publiques à l'époque constantinienne, 1928
1928: Les Patronages d'agriculteurs et de vici aux IVe et Ve de notre ère, 1928
1930: La Répression de la Magie et le culte des Gentils au IVe, 1930

References

External links 
 Notice in the Revue archéologique (1933, on Gallica)

Historians of ancient Rome
Writers from Brussels
1852 births
1933 deaths